Dinç is a Turkish surname. Notable people with the surname include:

 Hakan Dinç (born 1963), Turkish race car driver
 Kemal Dinç (born 1970), Turkish folk artist and music teacher
 Tuncay Dinç, Turkish bureaucrat

See also
 Dinç Bilgin (born 1940), Turkish businessman 
 DINC,  acronym that stands for "double income, no kids"
 

Turkish-language surnames